Acraea ungemachi is a butterfly in the family Nymphalidae. It is found in the highlands of Ethiopia.

Taxonomy
It is a member of the Acraea circeis species group - but see also Pierre & Bernaud, 2014

References

External links

Images representing  Acraea ungemachti at Bold.

Butterflies described in 1927
ungemachi
Endemic fauna of Ethiopia
Butterflies of Africa